A special election was held in  on August 29, 1797 to fill a vacancy left by the resignation of Elisha R. Potter (F) shortly after the end of the 1st session of the 5th Congress.

Election results

Tillinghast took office on November 13, 1797

See also
List of special elections to the United States House of Representatives

References

Rhode Island 1797 at-large
Rhode Island 1797 at-large
1797 at-large Special
Rhode Island at-large Special
United States House of Representatives at-large Special
United States House of Representatives 1797 at-large